Coney Island Colorado (commonly The Coney Island) in Bailey, Colorado is a 1950s diner shaped like a giant hot dog, with toppings. The building has been called "the best example of roadside architecture in the state".

The diner has indoor seating, courtyard seating and riverside picnic table seating.

It was originally built in 1966 on Colfax Ave. in Denver, named The Boardwalk at Coney Island. The first owner, Marcus Shannon had  intended to start a chain of eateries around the concept, and obtained a patent for the design, but the eatery closed in 1969.

In 1970, under new ownership, the stand was moved to the Rocky Mountain town of Aspen Park, along U.S. 285. Initially called Coney Island Dairy Land, it later dropped the last part of the name. Despite initial opposition, when it was put up for sale in 1999, a local campaign began to designate it a landmark and save it from destruction. The present owner purchased it for about $150,000 and added a state-of-the-art water purification system, a new secondary kitchen area and a complete restoration of the interior kitchen.

The popularity of the stand was such that its last day open in Aspen Park, "the waiting line extended literally for miles". On March 18, 2006, to make way for a  bank, the stand was moved again, 17 miles down U.S. Highway 285 to its present location in Bailey, close to Pike National Forest.

Appearances in media 
The restaurant made an appearance on one of Dana Atchley's "Digital Postcards" titled "World's Largest". "World's Largest" and 6 more of Dana Atchley's "Digital Postcards" were later included as viewable clips on "Kid Pix Studio's" "Wacky TV" feature.

During the intro of The Unaired Pilot from the television series South Park, a parody of the restaurant can be seen in the background. The episode, made in 1996, was an uncut version of Cartman Gets an Anal Probe, and was released on DVD in 2003 with The Complete Second Season. The stand would return to the show in the season 25 episode City People, where Cartman is forced to move in after his mom Liane loses her job.

It appeared in the 1999 television documentary A Hot Dog Program and on the 2004 television program Hot Dog Heavens.

On September 22, 2003 it was featured in the nationally syndicated newspaper comic Zippy the Pinhead.

There is a 1/6 scale model of the Coney Island stand at Tiny Town, in Morrison, Colorado.

See also

 List of hot dog restaurants

References

Further reading
Clark, Colleen. "10 great places to feel dwarfed by kitsch", USA TODAY, October 19, 2006.
Lawson, Pamela. "A Dog's Tale", Canyon Courier, March 8, 2006.
Lawson, Pamela. "Moving Day for the Dog", Canyon Courier, March 22, 2006.
Lawson, Pamela. "I thought it would be fun to restore Dog", High Timber Times, March 22, 2006.

External links
Bailey Colorado - Hot Dog Diner entry at Roadside America
Comin' Round The Mountain, photos from the Park County Bulletin, March 18, 2006.
Coney Island Hot Dog Run, photos of the move by Rick Gonzales.
Dogs, Craig's Picture of the Day, April 30, 2003.

Hot dog restaurants in the United States
Novelty buildings in Colorado
Buildings and structures in Park County, Colorado
Restaurants in Colorado
Roadside attractions in Colorado
Tourist attractions in Park County, Colorado
Restaurants established in 1966
1966 establishments in Colorado